

Background 

Garry Holloway FGAA, DipDT, JAA Appraiser, left a career in geology and in 1976 established Melbourne diamond design award-winning jeweller, Precious Metals.  In 1984 he studied the Fire Scope while undertaking the Gemological Association of Australia's Diamond Diploma. This led to a long and passionate interest in diamond cut. 
 
After the publication of the Gemological Institute of America's 'brilliance' report in 1998 this passion became a crusade to improve the cut quality of all diamonds. 
 
Garry developed the Holloway Cut Adviser (HCA) system in 2000, and released a portable Ideal-Scope in 2001. In 2004 he was both one of the four Cut Group organizer and a speaker at the 1st International Diamond Cut Conference (IDCC) in Moscow, Russia.  The HCA has been used to grade the cut quality of millions of dollars of diamonds in its first year, and billions over the past decade.  Holloway's HCA patent was granted on 31 July 2007. His diamond-cut consultancy has strong alliances with leading international diamond researchers and websites.

Awards 

1985, Garry Holloway was a recipient of the Gemmological Association of Australia, The Sutherland Medal (now known as the Sutherland Diamond Award). Garry received this for his exceptional study results in practical diamond grading and advanced diamond grading. The award is an annual Federal recognition presented by the association.

Research 
In July 2013 Garry Holloway  in collaboration with Sergey Sivovolenko, Yuri Shelementiev and Janak Mistry completed a study How diamond performance attributes brilliance scintillation and fire depend on human vision features.  The study was published in The Australian Gemmologist, journal of the Gemmological Association of Australia, July - September 2013, Volume 25, Number 3.

Patents 
July 31, 2017 The United States Patent & Trademark Office issued patent No. 7,251,619 to  Garry  Holloway of Canterbury, Australia, inventor of the HCA system, for a computer-implemented method for evaluating a gemstone. Rapaport Diamond.net article Gem Evaluation Method Earns Patent, August 3, 2007 provides an extensive review of the patent.

Inventions 
Ideal-Scope
Invented in 1985 and commercially made available in 2001, the Ideal Scope shows a round diamond's optical symmetry. It's a portable diamond brilliance and leakage gauge that shows the leakage of light through the diamond. Light leakage means poor light reflection and a dull diamond. The most brilliant diamonds have pink/red areas with a symmetrical black star and minimal white or pale area.
Today, many diamond sellers worldwide provide copies of the ideal scope images along with their diamond reports. For fancy-shaped diamonds, an ASET scope is used with provides the same light leakage images.

References
 Gem Evaluation Method Earns Patent, Rapaport News, August 2008
 GIA's Response to Letter to the Editor of the Australian Gemologist Pricescope Diamond Journal, 24 February 2007
 GIA Excellent Cut Grade Case Study Pricescope Diamond Journal, 14 March 2006
 Ideal-Scope Diamond System International Diamond Cut Conference (IDCC), January 2004
 Ideal-Scope Reference Chart Ideal-Scope Website
 International Diamond Cut Conference
 Vision Impacts Sparkle http://www.rapnet.com/News/NewsItem.aspx?ArticleID=47559&RDRIssueID=0&ArticleTitle=Vision+Impacts+Sparkle
 Patent No 7251619, Computer implemented method, computer program product, and system for gem evaluation

Living people
Year of birth missing (living people)